Isabel de Olvera was a free woman of mixed racial heritage in the 16th and 17th centuries. She lived in Querétaro, Mexico, and travelled on the Juan Guerra de Resa expedition to Santa Fe, sent to strengthen the Spanish claim to the colonised province of Santa Fe de Nuevo México. Olvera, the servant of a Spanish woman, filed a remarkable sworn deposition with the alcalde mayor of Querétaro before leaving on the expedition.

Deposition
Isabel de Olvera dictated her deposition before three witnesses: Mateo Laines, a free black man living in Querétaro; Anna Verdugo; a mestiza woman who lived near the city, and Santa Maria, a black slave woman of the alcalde mayor. The deposition ran as follows:

References

16th-century births
17th-century deaths
People from Querétaro
Mexican people of African descent
16th-century Mexican women
17th-century Mexican women
1600s in New Mexico